The Estadio Gigante de Arroyito is a stadium in the city of Rosario, Argentina. It is owned by club Rosario Central, serving as home venue for football matches. The Argentina national football team has played there several times.

The stadium was named after the Arroyito neighborhood where it is placed. Officially inaugurated on November 14, 1926, the stadium has a capacity of 45,500 spectators. Besides, Gigante de Arroyito was one of the venues for the 1978 FIFA World Cup and 1987 Copa América, both hosted by Argentina.

History 
When the club broke ties with the Central Argentine Railway, the British company took back the land where Rosario Central had its Parada Castellanos field. As a result, the club had to search a place where to build a new stadium. Meanwhile, the team played their home venues at Club Bolsa de Comercio. By the end of 1925, the Municipality granted Rosario Central concession of a land in the Arroyito neighborhood for a term of 20 years. The land was placed on Génova and Cordiviola streets, and the club built its new stadium there.

The first match at the stadium in Arroyito was a Copa Nicasio Vila (the main football competition in Rosario) match against arch-rival Newell's Old Boys, on November 14, 1926. In December 1927, the Municipality of Rosario set a term of 20 years for the concession. During that year, the club built a concrete grandstand with capacity for 7,000, increasing its total capacity to 36,000. The refurbished and complete stadium was inaugurated in October 1927, when Rosario Central played a friendly vs Uruguayan club Peñarol. The old official grandstand was refurbished in 1939 and definitely replaced in 1948. Nowadays, the lower seats are placed there.

By 1946, the club acquired a 38,000 m2 land on Iriondo and Pellegrini streets to build a new stadium due to the concession was about to expire. Nevertheless, Rosario Central reached an agreement with the Municipality, giving the council that land acquired in exchange for the land where the club had built its stadium in 1926.

In 1974, the Gigante stadium was chosen as venue for the 1978 FIFA World Cup. The National Reorganization Process (military government led by Jorge Rafael Videla) created an autarchic entity ("EAM") to take over refurbishment and constructions of stadiums to host the matches, among other duties related to the event. The EAM built the upper grandstands and lower seats of the Gigante, but costs had to be incurred by the club. Subsecquent depreciations of local currencies, resulted in much higher final costs than original estimations.

After works for the World Cup, the stadium increased its capacity to 41,465. Three matches of group 2 (with Tunisia, Mexico and Poland) and all three second-round games of the Argentina national team in the World Cup (where the squad beat Poland and Peru) were played in the Gigante.

In 1987, the stadium was one of the Copa América venues, hosting all the group C (Paraguay, Bolivia and Colombia) matches. In September 2009, the Gigante hosted one 2010 World Cup qualification match, when Brazil beat Argentina 3–1. The Gigante stadium had been proposed as venue by request of then Argentina manager Diego Maradona (and then approved by FIFA).

The stadium also hosted two The Rugby Championship matches played by Argentina, in 2012 and 2013.

Sporting events

1978 FIFA World Cup 
During the 1978 FIFA World Cup, the stadium hosted six matches, three Group 2 (first stage) matches and three more during second round.

1987 Copa América 
The stadium hosted three Group C matches in the 1987 Copa América held in Argentina:

Rugby union 
Rosario Central Stadium has hosted several rugby union games of the Argentina national team.

References

External links

 

Gigante de Arroyito
Gigante de Arroyito
Gigante de Arroyito
Rosario Central
Buildings and structures in Rosario, Santa Fe
Sport in Santa Fe Province